.бел (abbreviation of ) is an approved internationalized country code top-level domain (IDN ccTLD) for Belarus. Activation of the domain was finished in late 2014. The Latin script domain for Belarus is .by.

See also 
 .by
 top-level domain
 .бг
 .қаз
 .мкд
 .рф
 .срб
 .укр

External links 
 Registrators of domains

References 

бел
Internet in Belarus
Country code top-level domains